Brendan Gall (born September 2, 1978) is a Canadian writer, actor and producer living in Los Angeles, California.

Early life and education 
Gall graduated from the George Brown Theatre School.

Career 
Gall has written and/or produced for the television series Blindspot, Open Heart, and The L.A. Complex, the CBC Radio drama series Afghanada, the feature films The Lovebirds, The Go-Getters, and Dakota, and stage plays such as Panhandled, A Quiet Place, Alias Godot and Wide Awake Hearts.

As an actor, he has had lead or recurring roles on the series Remedy, Good God, Overruled!, and Men With Brooms, and guest appearances on Covert Affairs, The L.A. Complex, Against The Wall, Flashpoint, Murdoch Mysteries, and Stargate: Atlantis. He has also appeared in the films Remember, The Captive, Stag, Let's Rap and Dakota, and in numerous theatrical works, including the world premiere (and subsequent remounts) of Hannah Moscovitch's East of Berlin and the 2014 Toronto production of Duncan Macmillan's Lungs which garnered him a 2014 Dora Mavor Moore Award nomination for Best Actor.

A playwright in residence at Toronto's Tarragon Theatre from 2007 to 2017 and artistic director of his own theatre companies Single Threat and The Room, he has been nominated for four Dora Mavor Moore Awards for Outstanding New Play: twice in 2008 for Alias Godot and A Quiet Place, again in 2009 for The Gladstone Variations, and finally in 2011 for Wide Awake Hearts. Wide Awake Hearts and A Quiet Place were published by Coach House Books in 2010 under the title Minor Complications: Two Plays. The title was a shortlisted nominee in the English-language drama category of the 2011 Governor General's Awards. Gall has also been nominated twice for the K.M. Hunter Artist Award.

Bibliography 
 Screenplays
 2020: The Lovebirds
 2017: The Go-Getters (with Aaron Abrams)
 2007: Dakota
 Teleplays
 2017: Blindspot (7 episodes)
 2015: Open Heart (2 episodes)
 2012: The L.A. Complex (6 episodes)
 Stage Plays
 2010: Wide Awake Hearts
 2010: Red Machine: Under The Knife (collective creation)
 2010: 300 Tapes (collective creation)
 2009: Red Machine: Part One (contributing writer: "First & Last")
 2008: Alias Godot
 2008 The Sound Plays (contributing writer: "A Book On Tape")
 2007: The Gladstone Variations (contributing writer: "The Card Trick")
 2007: I Keep Dropping Sh*t (collective creation)
 2006: Don't Wake Me (collective creation)
 2006: Autoshow (contributing writer: "Hawk Limited")
 2005: A Quiet Place
 2005: Head-Smashed-In Buffalo Jump (collective creation)
 2004: Panhandled
 2003: The Awesome Club Presents "It's Raining Fun!" (contributed sketches)
 Collections
 2010: Minor Complications: Two Plays, Coach House Books;

Awards and nominations
 2015: Lungs - Dora Mavor Moore Award nomination, Best Actor
 2014: Lungs - My Theatre Award nomination, Best Actor
 2014: K.M. Hunter Artist Award nomination, Theatre
 2011: Minor Complications: Two Plays - Governor General's Literary Award for Drama nomination, English-Language Category
 2011: Wide Awake Hearts - Dora Mavor Moore Award nomination, Best New Play
 2011: Men With Brooms - Canadian Comedy Awards nomination, Best Ensemble
 2010: K.M. Hunter Artist Award nomination, Theatre
 2009: Alias Godot - Dora Mavor Moore Award nomination, Best New Play
 2009: East of Berlin - Elizabeth Sterling Haynes Award nomination, Best Actor
 2008: A Quiet Place - Dora Mavor Moore Award nomination, Best New Play
 2008: The Gladstone Variations - Dora Mavor Moore Award nomination, Best New Play
 2003: A Quiet Place - Herman Voaden National Playwriting Award, Honourable Mention

References

External links

Brendan Gall at the Playwrights Guild of Canada

1978 births
Canadian male television actors
Canadian male film actors
Canadian male stage actors
21st-century Canadian dramatists and playwrights
Canadian male screenwriters
Canadian television writers
Canadian radio writers
Living people
Male actors from Halifax, Nova Scotia
Writers from Halifax, Nova Scotia
Canadian male dramatists and playwrights
21st-century Canadian male writers
Canadian Film Centre alumni
Canadian male television writers
21st-century Canadian screenwriters